Do Gunchi (also Romanized as Do Gūnchī; also known as Do Gonjī) is a village in Gorganbuy Rural District, in the Central District of Aqqala County, Golestan Province, Iran. At the 2006 census, its population was 2,112, in 453 families.

References 

Populated places in Aqqala County